Urdaneta is one of the 20 municipalities of the state of Trujillo, Venezuela. The municipality occupies an area of 115 km2 with a population of 20,162 inhabitants according to the 2011 census.

Parishes
The municipality consists of the following six parishes:

 Cabimbú 
 Jajó 
 La Mesa de Esnujaque 
 Santiago 
 Tuñame 
 La Quebrada

References

Municipalities of Trujillo (state)